Soy molasses is brown viscous syrup with a typical bittersweet flavor. A by-product of aqueous alcohol soy protein concentrate production, soy molasses is a concentrated, desolventized, aqueous alcohol extract of defatted soybean flakes.

The term "soy molasses" was coined by Daniel Chajuss, the founder of Hayes Ashdod Ltd., which first commercially produced and marketed soy molasses in the early 1960s. The name was intended to distinguish the product from “soybean whey” or “condensed soybean solubles”, the by-products available at the time from soy protein isolate and acid washed soy protein concentrate production.

Manufacture
The alcohols are removed from the liquid extract by evaporation and the distillation residue is an aqueous solution of the sugars and other soy solubles. This solution is concentrated to viscous honey-like consistency to yield soy molasses.

Composition
Typically, soy molasses contains 50% total soluble solids. These solids consist of carbohydrates (60%), proteins and other nitrogenous substances (10%), minerals (10%), fats and lipoids (20%). The major constituents of soy molasses are sugars that include oligosaccharides (stachyose and raffinose), disaccharides (sucrose) and minor amounts of monosaccharides (fructose and glucose). Minor constituents include saponins, protein, lipid, minerals (ash), isoflavones, and other organic materials.

Use
Soy molasses is used as a feed ingredient in mixed feeds as pelleting aid, added to soybean meal (e.g. by spraying it into the soybean meal desolventizer toaster), mixed with soy hulls, and used in liquid animal feed diets. Soy molasses can be used as a fermentation aid, as a prebiotic, and as an ingredient in specialized breads.

It is also possible to burn soy molasses in a dedicated boiler to generate process steam. In combination with a support fuel (e.g. natural gas, ...) the low calorific liquid can be valorized in a steam boiler.

Soy molasses is an important commercial and biological product, and a source of phytochemicals and soy sugars.

References
 Daniel Chajuss, Soy Molasses: Processing and Utilization as a Functional Food, in KeShun Liu, Editor, Soybeans as Functional Foods and Ingredients, AOCS Press, Champaign. Ill., USA, pp. 201–208, 2004.

Food ingredients
Soy-based foods